Route 155 (known locally as McGillivray Boulevard) is a city route in Winnipeg, Manitoba.  It runs from the Perimeter Highway (PTH 100) to Route 42 (Pembina Highway).

This major road begins at Oak Bluff and runs concurrently with PTH 3 to the Winnipeg city limits, where PTH 3 officially terminates.  It goes through residential, commercial, and industrial areas before reaching its eastern terminus with Pembina Highway in the city's south end. The speed limit ranges from 60 km/h (37 mph) to 100 km/h (62 mph).
It passed directly by the old village of Fort Whyte which is now considered part of the Whyte Ridge development in Winnipeg.  It also provides access to the Trans Canada Trail at McGillivray Boulevard and Front Street.  The Trans Canada Trail walks one through the Fort Whyte Centre.

Major intersections

References

External links
Fort Whyte Alive

155